Krzysztof Klicki (born 1962) is the President of Kolporter Holding S.A. He owns all of Kolporter's shares, the largest private distributor of the press (with more than 44 percent of the media market).

He started Kolporter after the free market transformation in Poland, selling newspapers - in particular Gazeta Wyborcza - which he collected from Warsaw overnight and sold in Kielce the next day (the name Kolporter means "distributor" in Polish). Now there are over a dozen companies in several sectors of the Polish market that are a part of Kolporter Holding S.A.

Klicki is a graduate of the Institute of Physics, Higher Pedagogical School in Kielce.  He passed his Matura ('A' levels) at the Ogólnokształcącym V Liceum Fr. Peter Sciegiennego in Kielce. He and his wife (they married right after graduating from high school) have three daughters.

As of July 2010, Krzysztof Klicki is one of the 100 richest Poles (in 22nd position) with commercial assets of around 900 million zloty.

Business empire

He started in 1989 from the rozwożenia kiosks "Gazeta Wyborcza" Oplem Kadett with his father. The money he earned he invested in a construction company. Today Kolporter S.A. supplies more than 28,500 points of sale.

In 2004, the Kolporter Group recorded about 2.14 billion zloty of revenue and 19 million zloty net profit. Currently, Krzysztof Klicki is one of the 100 richest Poles (in 22nd position) with commercial assets of around 850 million zloty.

Korona Kielce Football Club 

Between the years 2002 - 2008, Klicki was a part-owner of Korona Kielce football club. However, on 2 April 2008 he announced the withdrawal of sponsorship of Korona Kielce. Dariusz W was employed by Krzysztof Klicki, owner of the Korona Kielce team's sponsor Kolporter, to reform the third division club, which was then on the verge of bankruptcy. He contributed significantly to Korona Kielce's advancement to the first division but, following Dariusz W's arrest, Kolporter decided to withdraw its sponsorship of the club. Klicki's did this a few days after the Central Anticorruption Agency (CBA) and police arrested six individuals involved in setting up Korona's match results for bribes in the 2003/2004 season.

References

1962 births
Korona Kielce
Polish businesspeople
Living people